Recep Çiftçi (born 30 March 1995) is a Turkish Paralympic judoka. He won one of the bronze medals in the men's 60 kg event at the 2020 Summer Paralympics held in Tokyo, Japan.

References

External links 
 

Living people
1995 births
Turkish male judoka
Paralympic judoka of Turkey
Paralympic bronze medalists for Turkey
Paralympic medalists in judo
Judoka at the 2020 Summer Paralympics
Medalists at the 2020 Summer Paralympics
Place of birth missing (living people)
20th-century Turkish people
21st-century Turkish people